Joan Margaret Clark (born March 27, 1922) is an American retired diplomat who served as United States Ambassador to Malta between 1979 and 1981. Born in Ridgefield Park, New Jersey, she is a member of the American Academy of Diplomacy. In 2007, Clark was presented the Lifetime Contributions to American Diplomacy Award by the American Foreign Service Association.

Clark left her post in Malta when she became Director General of the Foreign Service and Director of Personnel.  She also served as Director of the Office of Management Policy (April 10, 1977 – March 20, 1979) and Assistant Secretary of State for Consular Affairs (1983-1989).

References
Foreign Service Journal article on her Lifetime Contributions to American Diplomacy Award. 

1922 births
Ambassadors of the United States to Malta
People from Ridgefield Park, New Jersey
Living people
United States Foreign Service personnel
American women ambassadors
Directors General of the United States Foreign Service
21st-century American women